Vicolungo is a comune (municipality) in the Province of Novara in the Italian region Piedmont, located about  northeast of Turin and about  northwest of Novara.

Vicolungo borders the following municipalities: Arborio, Biandrate, Casaleggio Novara, Landiona, Mandello Vitta, Recetto, and San Pietro Mosezzo.

Demographic evolution

References

Cities and towns in Piedmont